Nina Kotova is an American cellist of Eastern European decent. As well as being a versatile artist and an established composer she is a recording artist who performs both as a soloist with major orchestras and as a chamber musician.

Education 
Kotova studied at the Moscow Conservatory, at the Musikhochschule in Cologne, and in the USA, giving her first performance as a soloist with orchestra at the age 11 and graduating summa cum laude.

Career 
Kotova made her Western debut at the Wigmore Hall, performed at the Barbican Centre in London in 1996, signed contract and released her chart-topping debut album for Philips Classics, and made her Carnegie Hall debut in 1999.

Kotova has performed in recital and as a soloist with major orchestras across the globe touring the capitals of Europe, Asia and the Americas. She has performed at the Concertgebouw and at the Berlin Philharmonic and has collaborated with leading artists and conductors such as Vladimir Jurowski, Jean-Yves Thibaudet, Antonio Pappano, John Malkovich, Hélène Grimaud, Jeremy Irons, Joshua Bell, Lang Lang, Maxim Vengerov, Sarah Chang, Bobby McFerrin, Sting and many more. She has had the distinction of performing live in broadcast from Red Square in Moscow, for the Imperial family of Japan, and at Buckingham Palace in a special concert for King Charles III.

In 2011, Kotova received an award for outstanding cultural contribution to Tuscany from the Tuscan-American Association as a co-founder of the Tuscan Sun Festival. She co-founded the Tuscan Sun Festival in 2003 and its sister-festival Festival Del Sole in Napa Valley in 2006 and served as the Artistic Director of the Tuscan Sun Festival (also known as the Festival del Sole) in Cortona, Italy. She is an Artistic co-director of the concert series Domus Artium.

As a professor, Nina Kotova has taught as an Artist in Residence at the University of Texas in Austin, Texas.Ms. Kotova was recently appointed this year as a permanent professor of Violoncello at the prestigious International Academy of Imola in Italy.

Shortly before the fall of the Soviet Union, Nina has defected to the West. In her early twenties, Nina has briefly pursued her second career as a top high fashion model, working with such designers as Emanuel Ungaro, Missoni, Chanel and others for fashion shows and editorial. After she left the government owned cello in her country, her dream was to own a cello and to begin performing.

In addition to her debut album for Philips Classics, she has recorded the Bloch Schelomo and her own Cello Concerto, the Dvorak Cello Concerto with the Philharmonia Orchestra for Sony, and the Deutsche Grammophon compilation Masters of the Bow, paying homage to the greatest cellists of the last 50 years. She released a recording of the Bach Cello Suites, a recording of Russian sonatas with pianist Fabio Bidini for Warner Classics, Nina Kotova Plays Tchaikovsky recording for Delos Productions with the Tchaikovsky Symphony Orchestra conducted by Vladimir Fedoseyev,  «Romantic Recital» with pianist Jose Feghali.

She has been the subject of numerous features in Vogue, Elle, Hello!, Harper's Bazaar, Newsweek, The Sunday Telegraph, 'The Wall Street Journal, 'The New York Post  and HuffPost.

She has appeared on the covers of Classic FM Magazine, Classical Music magazine, Gramophone China,  Il Venerdi di Repubblica Italia, Record Forum, and  Reader's Digest, on the Charlie Rose Show, "Breakfast With The Arts" and on Sky Group.

Nina has worked on music and environmental projects with such actors and artists as Robert Redford, Jeremy Irons, Charles Dance, John Malkovich. 
  
As an artist, Nina Kotova has been featured in the books of several leading photographers such as Arrowsmith: Fashion, Beauty & and Joyce Tenneson Joyce Tenneson: Transformations.

"...Nina is a musician of high seriousness and real talent..." - TIME MAGAZINE 

"...She's a talent to reckon with - poised, committed, graceful and spirited." - Los Angeles Times

Discography
 Nina Kotova - Chopin, Faure, Falla, Glazunov, et al. with the Moscow Chamber Orchestra; Constantine Orbelian, conductor - Philips Records, 1999
 Bloch, Bruch, Kotova: Nina Kotova-Cello Concerto with Philharmonia of Russia; Constantine Orbelian, conductor - Delos Productions, 2002
 Masters Of The Bow - Cello (2 CD) - Deutsche Grammophon, 2003
 Dvorak: Cello Concerto in B minor, Op. 104 with Philharmonia Orchestra; Andrew Litton, conductor - Sony Classical, 2008
 Bach: 6 Suites for Cello Solo (2 CD) - Warner Classics, 2014
 Rachmaninov - Prokofiev: Cello Sonatas with Fabio Bidini, pianist - Warner Classics, 2017
 Nina Kotova Plays Tchaikovsky with Tchaikovsky Symphony Orchestra; Vladimir Fedoseyev, conductor - Delos Productions, 2017
 A Romantic Recital: Brahms, Reger, Schumann, with Jose Feghali, pianist - Warner Classics, 2021

References

External links
 Home ninakotova.com
 festivaldelsole.com
 imgartists.com 
 youtube.com
 warnerclassics.com
 iTunes.com
 Spotify.com
 amazon.com

Living people
Russian classical cellists
Russian women classical cellists
1969 births